The 85th Emperor's Cup was held between September 17, 2005 and January 1, 2006. The tournament was won by Urawa Red Diamonds. The J.League Division 2 clubs qualified automatically to the third round, while the J.League Division 1 clubs qualified automatically to the fourth round.

Schedule

Matches

First round

Second round

Third round

Fourth round

Fifth round

Quarter finals

Semi finals

Final

References
 RSSSF.com

2005
2005 domestic association football cups
2005 in Japanese football
2006 in Japanese football